Persatuan Sepakbola Indonesia Halmahera Barat or Persihalbar is a football club based in Jailolo, West Halmahera, North Maluku. They are currently playing at Liga 3 and their homebase is Banau Stadium.

Honours
 Liga 3 North Maluku
 Champions: 2019

References

Football clubs in Indonesia
Football clubs in North Maluku
Association football clubs established in 2005
2005 establishments in Indonesia